BADIL Resource Center for Palestinian Residency and Refugee Rights is an independent, human rights non-profit organization committed to protect and promote the rights of Palestinian refugees and internally displaced persons. BADIL was established in January 1998. According to pro-Israel group NGO Monitor, BADIL is engaging in "lawfare" against Israeli military officials and has also published antisemitic cartoons.

BADIL has special consultative status with UN ECOSOC and is also part of a large number of Palestinian organisation networks.

BADIL publishes al-Majdal, an English language quarterly magazine about Palestinian refugee issues.

References

External links
 BADIL: Official website
 Ongoing Nakba: A project of BADIL

Non-profit organizations based in Israel
Non-governmental organizations involved in the Israeli–Palestinian conflict
Organizations established in 1998
Palestinian politics